Alexander Kushnir (born 2 November 1978) is an Israeli politician. He currently serves as a member of the Knesset for Yisrael Beiteinu.

Biography
Kushnir was born in the Soviet Union. In 1992, he immigrated to Israel with his mother, settling in Ashkelon. He joined the Israeli Defense Forces as a combatant in the Givati Brigade, rising to become  a company commander in the brigade. Upon his release from the IDF, he enlisted in Shin Bet and held a variety of field positions.

Kushnir graduated with a bachelor's degree in economics from the Hebrew University of Jerusalem and an MBA with an internship in finance from Ono Academic College. He has held management positions in the energy, retail, and finance sectors and served as a representative of the American Jewish Joint Distribution Committee in Belarus.

Prior to the 2015 Knesset elections, Kushnir was placed 17th on the Yisrael Beiteinu list. Although the party won only six seats, when Yisrael Beiteinu joined the coalition government the following year, Kushnir was appointed Director-General of the Ministry of Aliyah and Integration when the party's Sofa Landver became the minister responsible for the portfolio. In February 2019, he was placed seventh place on the party's list for the April 2019 elections, but again failed to be elected as Yisrael Beiteinu won only five seats. However, in the early elections in September 2019, he was elected as the party gained eight seats.

Kushnir is married and has a daughter. He lives in Ashkelon.

References

1978 births
Living people
Ukrainian Jews
Ukrainian emigrants to Israel
Hebrew University of Jerusalem Faculty of Social Sciences alumni
Ono Academic College alumni
Israeli civil servants
Yisrael Beiteinu politicians
Members of the 22nd Knesset (2019–2020)
Members of the 23rd Knesset (2020–2021)
Members of the 24th Knesset (2021–2022)
Members of the 25th Knesset (2022–)
People from Drohobych
Jewish Israeli politicians